The 14th Annual Panasonic Gobel Awards was a ceremony held to honoring the favorite in Indonesian television programming/individual/production works, as chosen by the verification team of this ceremony awards. It was held on March 25, 2011, at the Djakarta Theater XXI in Jalan M.H. Thamrin, Menteng, Central Jakarta. This year's edition of the ceremony awards was themed "Bersama Untuk Bumi Indonesia" (en: Together for Indonesian Earth). The ceremony was hosted by presenter Indra Bekti and Sari Nila on the red carpet and by Fanny Febriana for the live event and also introduced as Miss Green.

The awards featured some of Indonesia's best singers such as Nidji, SM*SH, Vicky Shu, Inul Daratista, Andien, Titi Sjuman, D'Bagindas and many more. The performers, both singers and nominee readers wore formal clothes designed by Indonesia's best designers and the evening peak of this 2011 ceremony awards broadcast live by TV stations under the control of MNC Group, such as RCTI, MNCTV, and Global TV.

Judges (Verification Team) 
 Karni Ilyas (TV Delegation),
 Ezki Suyanto (Commissaries of KPI-Komisi Penyiaran Indonesia),
 Putra Nababan (Delegation from desk News),
 Manoj Punjabi (Expert of Soap opera program and Production House),
 Anjasmara (Delegation of artist),
 Titan Hermawan(Station TV Delegation),
 Maman Hermawan (expertise program TV),
 Harsiwi Achmad (Delegation from station TV and production house),
 Soraya Perucha (Delegation from station TV),
 Yeni Anshar (Delegation from station TV) And
 Feni Rose (expertise program infotainment).

Winners and nominees 
The nominees were announced on February 24, 2011. For this year, the categories added for four new category: "Favorite FTV Program", "Favorite Travel, Hobbies, and Lifestyle Program", "Favorite News Magazine Program" and "Favorite Sport Journal Program". Winners are listed first and highlighted on boldface.

Program

Individual

External links 
 PGA 2011 Official Sites
  Pemenang PGA 2011

Panasonic Gobel Awards
2011 television awards